Say Sam Al (born 15 May 1980) is a Cambodian politician serving as the Minister of Environment since 2013. He is the son of Say Chhum, President of the Senate and Vice President of the Cambodian People's Party.

References

1980 births
21st-century Cambodian politicians 
Living people
Environment ministers 
Government ministers of Cambodia
Cambodian People's Party politicians
Members of the National Assembly (Cambodia)
Monash University alumni